The 2021 All-Ireland Under-20 Hurling Championship was the third staging of the All-Ireland Under-20 Championship and the 58th staging overall of a hurling championship for players between the minor and senior grades. The championship began on 29 June 2021 and ended on 18 August 2021.

The 2021 championship was the first to begin before the previous year's championship had concluded. Cork were the defending champions. The number of participating teams also increased, with Down and Kildare joining the Leinster Championship.

The final was played on 18 August 2021 at Semple Stadium in Thurles, between Cork and Galway, in what was their first meeting in a final in 23 years. Cork won the match by 4-19 to 2-14 to claim their 13th championship title overall and a second title in succession. It was also a 10th successive win for a Munster team in the All-Ireland final.

Kildare's Liam Dempsey was the championship's top scorer with 0-37.

Results

Leinster Under-20 Hurling Championship

Round 1

Round 2

Quarter-finals

Semi-finals

Final

Munster Under-20 Hurling Championship

Quarter-finals

Semi-finals

Final

All-Ireland Under-20 Hurling Championship

Final

Championship statistics

Top scorers

Top scorers overall

Top scorers in a single game

Miscellaneous

 Cathal O'Neill set a new scoring record for Munster finals when he scored 0-16 against Cork.

Notes

References

Under-20
All-Ireland Under-20 Hurling Championship